Ek Saal is a 1957 Indian  romantic drama film directed by Devendra Goel and starring Ashok Kumar and Madhubala in lead roles. The film is about a father of a dying girl who hires a conman to make his dying daughter's last year a happier one.

A critical and commercial success, Ek Saal was the first film in the string of box-office hits Madhubala starred in between 1958 and 1962.

Plot
Bombay-based Usha Sinha (Madhubala) lives a wealthy lifestyle with her widowed dad, a retired Colonel. During her birthday celebrations at her grandmother (Pratima Devi)'s house in Lucknow, she encounters a flirt, but avoids him, only to run into him again in a taxi-cab, and then in her very own house in Bombay. She finds out that his name is Suresh (Ashok Kumar), who has been hired by her dad as a Manager. Eventually both she and Suresh fall in love with each other. Suresh appears to care a lot about Usha and even takes her to a doctor for a medical check-up to ensure her well-being, to which she agrees, without knowing that she has brain tumor and is not expected to live more than one year. What the Usha do not know is that Suresh does not love her at alI, for his true love is a Lucknow-based woman named Rajani (Kuldip Kaur), and he is merely here to win their trust, so that he can be successful in robbing them of all their cash and valuables.

Cast

 Ashok Kumar as Suresh Kumar
 Madhubala as Usha Sinha
 Kuldip Kaur as Rajini
 Johnny Walker as J.B. Pinto
 Minoo Mumtaz as Mary
 Mehmood as Doctor
 Madan Puri as Dr. M.M. Puri

Soundtrack
The soundtrack of Ek Saal was composed by Ravi and lyrics were penned by Prem Dhawan and Ravi.

Release

Critical reception 
Filmi Geek wrote, "There is lots and lots of pretty to enjoy [in the film]". It praised Madhubala for playing a brain tumor patient: "Madhubala is utterly radiant [...], she does play a marvelous ingenue, and she's simply lovely".

Box office 
Ek Saal earned 5.1 million at the box office and was commercially successful. It eventually became the twelfth highest-grossing film of 1957. Revenue wise, it was the nineteenth highest-grossing film of the year.

References

External links 
 

1957 films
1950s Hindi-language films